Lotte is a Dutch telenovela television series. The series was broadcast by the commercial station Tien, upon which it was shown every weekday at 6:30 pm.

The series is based on the Colombian telenovela Yo soy Betty, la fea and centres on the protagonist, Lotte Pronk, a business economics graduate who passed with honours and has trouble finding a job until she comes across a secretary job in an international fashion company called "Emoda", where at the same time a conflict is occurring in the business between two prospective CEOs.

She begins the series mocked by many of her colleagues for being "ugly", and as the series progresses she develops confidence, moves up the ladder and explores romantic interests. The series also features on the fellow Emoda employees, and their relationships and career problems.

Lotte is written by a team of writers led by Marciel Witteman, also known for the Dutch soap opera Goudkust, and scripts for the drama series Westenwind. The series was directed  by Vincent Schuurman and Manin de Wilt.

Lotte is the first Dutch telenovela which in its original form was to consist of 200 episodes. On 11 December 2006, Tien officially announced that the series would get 35 extra episodes. Marciel Witteman wanted the extra episodes to round off the storylines of some of the characters. In the final episode all the characters were present.

On 9 April 2007, Lotte ended its run on Tien with its finale.

Ratings

An average of between 250,000 and 300,000 people tuned in for each episode.

Cast

References

External links 
 
 Official site

2006 telenovelas
2007 telenovelas
2006 Dutch television series debuts
2007 Dutch television series endings
Yo soy Betty, la fea
Television series by Fremantle (company)
Dutch television soap operas
2000s Dutch television series
Tien (TV channel) original programming